The Rosario Islands (Islas del Rosario), also referred to as Corales Islas del Rosario (Coral Islands of Rosario), is an archipelago located off the coast of Colombia, approximately  from Cartagena. It is one of the 46 Natural National Parks of Colombia. The national park was founded in 1988, to protect one of the most important coral reefs of the Colombian Caribbean coast. People can visit the national park area of the islands, and tours are available. Isla Rosario has an aquarium and open-sea oceanarium (oceanario) that people can visit. Activities include swimming, snorkeling and fishing, among others.

Geography and geology

Characteristics
This area was declared a Natural National Park due to the necessity to preserve and protect the coral reefs and the associated ecosystems, such as the sea grass and mangroves, and the numerous species of seaweed and animals that inhabit them.

Coral reef formation is "...enhanced on the windward side of the islands" due to wave action and water qualities that encourage coral growth.

The islands have become popular tourist destinations for day tours as well as hotels and lodges on a few of the islands.

History
In 1885, the area was described as "extremely dangerous to approach" by boat.

The Colombian drug lord and narcoterrorist, Pablo Escobar, owned a huge Caribbean getaway on Isla Grande. The compound, now half-demolished and overtaken by vegetation and wild animals, featured a mansion, apartments, courtyards, a large swimming pool, a helicopter landing pad, reinforced windows, tiled floors, and a large but unfinished building to the side of the mansion.

See also

 Caribbean region of Colombia
 Insular region of Colombia
 List of islands of South America

References 

National parks of Colombia
Geography of Bolívar Department
Caribbean islands of Colombia
Underwater diving sites in the Caribbean
Underwater diving sites in Colombia